The Battle of Firmum was fought between a Roman force under Gnaeus Pompey Strabo and a rebel force led by Lafrenius. It took place during the Social War and was a Roman victory.

Having been defeated by a much larger rebel force at Mount Falernus and then besieged, Pompey was in a precarious situation. When he heard more rebels were approaching he launched two sallies. One was to attack the rebels head on while the other, led by Sulpicius, attacked their rear. Despite successfully pulling off the manoeuvre the battle didn't turn in the Romans favour, the result remaining up in the air until some Romans managed to set fire to the rebel camp. Seeing their camp burning the rebels lost heart and fled in disorder. During the battle the rebel commander, Lafrenius, was killed.

References

Firmum
90 BC
Firmum